William "Bill" Clyde Otto (July 17, 1948) was a Republican member of the Kansas House of Representatives, representing the 9th district.  He served from 2005 to 2012 and was succeeded by Edwin Bideau.

Prior to his election to the House, Otto served on the Southern Coffey County Site Council (2003–2006), LeRoy City Council (2002–2004), Unified School District 245 Site Council (2000–2003), and the Unified School District 247 Cherokee (1984).

Receiving both his bachelor's and master's degrees from Pittsburg State University, Otto served as principal at Central Heights Elementary (1976–1978) and McCune High School (1978–79).  He also worked as a performance accreditation director for USD 245 (1984–2004).

Otto is known for his expressing his political opinions in controversial ways. In 2009, the representative was criticized by a national civil rights organization for a video he had posted on YouTube, called "RedNeck Rap", in which he criticized President Barack Obama while wearing a hat with the words "Opossum: The Other Dark Meat". Otto claimed that the criticism was unfair and that the slogan on his hat was a reference to his "Ozark-American" heritage, not Obama. Otto also made a comparison between Obama and Adolf Hitler in a 2012 letter to the editor.

Committee membership
 Education
 Health and Human Services
 Elections
 Local Government
 Joint Committee on Children's Issues

Major donors
The top 5 donors to Otto's 2008 campaign were mostly professional associations:
1. Kansas Medical Society 	$1,000
2. Union Pacific Railroad 	$700
3. Kansas Dental Assoc 	$600
4. Kansas Contractors Assoc 	$600
5. Lewis, Diana C 	$500

References

External links
 Kansas Legislature - Bill Otto
 Project Vote Smart profile
 Kansas Votes profile
 State Surge - Legislative and voting track record
 Follow the Money campaign contributions:
 2004, 2006, 2008

Republican Party members of the Kansas House of Representatives
People from Coffey County, Kansas
Living people
1948 births